Melt is the second studio album by American country music group Rascal Flatts. It was released on October 29, 2002, on Lyric Street Records and sold 3,073,000 copies in the United States up to May 2009. The album’s first single "These Days" was the group's first Number One hit on the US Billboard Hot Country Songs charts. The follow-ups, "Love You Out Loud" and "I Melt", respectively reached number 3 and number 2, while "Mayberry" was also a Number One. A music video was also made for "My Worst Fear" in 2004 even though it was never released as a single.

Writing and recording
Dry County Girl
"I was writing with Marcus (Hummon) last year [2001] and he said, "Mind if I play you a song?" He played it in my truck while we were on the way to lunch and I was blown away. The melody is so captivating. I played it for Jay and Gary and we loved it and put it on hold. It has a lot of energy and a good little story" ~Joe Don Rooney

Like I Am
"This is a very special song for me, since I wrote it after a conversation with my girlfriend Kassidy. For me, like for a lot of men, when a woman says great things about you it can be hard to believe. I thought, "I don’t see EVERYTHING you see in me, but since you see it, I’ll try to be that way." It was very easy to write, and as soon as I came up with the melody I shared the idea with Danny Orton and we wrote it." ~Joe Don Rooney

You
The song "You" was originally scheduled to be recorded by Tim McGraw when the band discovered it towards the end of recording. The publishing company told them if McGraw didn't record the song by 2 p.m. that day they could have it. He didn't cut it and the band recorded it that same day.

Shine On
"When we won the ACM award, the 7th to 12th graders in my hometown, Picher, Oklahoma, made a huge banner and posed in the gymnasium with it. It said, "Shine On, Joe Don." It was so sweet, and I thought, "We’ve gotta write a song called ‘Shine On’." A few months afterward I had this cool melody on the bus and the "Shine On" idea came into my head. I was playing it for Jay and Gary and they started singing this melody over the chord progression. I said, "Sing ‘Shine on’" and boom, right then and there it was married together. It was magic. We wrote it in about 45 minutes." ~Joe Don Rooney

Track listing

Personnel 
Rascal Flatts
 Jay DeMarcus – bass guitar, backing vocals 
 Gary LeVox – lead vocals
 Joe Don Rooney – electric guitar (2, 4, 7, 10), backing vocals

Additional Musicians
 Steve Nathan – keyboards
 Tim Akers – keyboards (2, 3, 4, 6, 8), accordion (4)
 Larry Beaird – acoustic guitar, banjo (4)
 Dann Huff – electric guitar (1, 7)
 Jerry McPherson – electric guitar (1-8, 10, 11), bouzouki (5)
 J. T. Corenflos – electric guitar (7)
 Paul Franklin – steel guitar (3, 8, 9, 11)
 Jonathan Yudkin – mandolin, fiddle, cello (6), viola (6), violin (6)
 Jimmy Stewart  – dobro (10)
 Lonnie Wilson – drums

Production 
 Mark Bright – producer 
 Marty Williams – producer, recording, mixing, mastering 
 Rascal Flatts – producers
 Doug Howard – A&R direction 
 Scott Kidd – recording assistant, mix assistant, digital editing 
 Derek Bason – digital editing 
 Christopher Rowe – digital editing 
 Mike "Frog" Griffith – production coordinator 
 Sherri Halford – art direction 
 Greg McCarn – art direction 
 Glenn Sweitzer – design 
 Fresh Design – design 
 David Johnson – photography 
 Debra Wingo – hair stylist, make-up

Charts

Weekly charts

Year-end charts

Certifications

References

2002 albums
Rascal Flatts albums
Lyric Street Records albums
Albums produced by Mark Bright (record producer)